The South Shore is a neighborhood in Pittsburgh, Pennsylvania South Side.  The South Shore consists of the area surrounding Carson Street, from the West End Bridge to the Liberty Bridge.

The South Shore is an industrial neighborhood, home to several warehouses.  The neighborhood is primarily made up of the popular Station Square, a mixed-use historic preservation development of the former Pittsburgh and Lake Erie Railroad and surrounding areas, conceptualized by Arthur P. Ziegler Jr. one of the founding national leaders of historic preservation in the United States, and President of the  Pittsburgh History and Landmarks Foundation.

The population of the South Shore was just 56 in the 2000 census, and 19 in 2010.

Surrounding Pittsburgh neighborhoods
South Side Flats, Mt. Washington (via South Hills Light Rail Tunnel, Wabash Tunnel, Duquesne Incline and Monongahela Incline), Downtown Pittsburgh (via Smithfield Street Bridge), West End Valley

See also
 List of Pittsburgh neighborhoods

References

Further reading

External links
Interactive Pittsburgh Neighborhoods Map

Neighborhoods in Pittsburgh
Economy of Pittsburgh
Shopping districts and streets in the United States
Entertainment districts in the United States